Aidan O'Connor (born 2002) is an Irish hurler. At club level, he plays with Ballybrown, while he is also a member of the Limerick senior hurling team. He usually lines out as a forward.

Career

O'Connor first played hurling as a schoolboy with Ardscoil Rís, while also simultaneously lining out at juvenile and underage levels with the Ballybrown club. He won three consecutive Limerick Premier MHC titles with the club in 2019, 2020 and as team captain in 2021. The run of underage success continued in 2022 when he claimed a Limerick Premier U21HC title. By that stage, O'Connor had already joined the club's senior team.

O'Connor first appeared at inter-county level with Limerick as a member of the minor team that won the Munster MHC title in 2019. He later spent three consecutive seasons with the under-20 team and was at centre-forward when Limerick were beaten by Kilkenny in the 2022 All-Ireland under-20 final. O'Connor ended his under-20 tenure by being named Munster Under-20 Player of the Year.

O'Connor made his first appearance for the senior team during the 2023 Munster Senior Hurling League.

Career statistics

Club

Inter-county

Honours

Ballybrown
Limerick Premier Under-21 Hurling Championship: 2022
Limerick Premier Minor Hurling Championship: 2019, 2020, 2021 (c)

Limerick
Munster Under-20 Hurling Championship: 2022
Munster Minor Hurling Championship: 2019

References

2002 births
Living people
Ballybrown hurlers
Limerick inter-county hurlers